Out of Mesopotamia is a novel book written by Salar Abdoh and published in 2020. The books is narrated by Saleh, a middle-aged Iranian journalist who moonlights as a writer for one of Iran's most popular TV shows but cannot keep himself away from the front lines in neighboring Iraq and Syria. There, the fight against the Islamic State is a proxy war, an existential battle, a declaration of faith, and, for some, a passing weekend affair.

It is Abdoh's second book for Akashic.

The book was reviewed by the New York Times and was one of eleven book recommendations from September 17, 2020.

References

External links
On Contact Interview with the Author

2020 novels
Akashic Books books